Artyom Fyodorovich Sergeyev (5 March 1921 – 15 January 2008) was the adopted son of Joseph Stalin. He became a major general in the Soviet military.

Sergeyev's biological father, Fyodor Sergeyev, a close friend of Stalin, died in the Aerowagon train crash in 1921. Lenin initiated the following adoption by Stalin.

His military service began in 1938 at the age of 17 and he was active in fighting against German troops in World War II. He was appointed lieutenant colonel at the age of 23 and continued serving in the military after the war.

He wrote two books about war and Stalin. His first wife was Amaya Ruiz Ibárruri, the daughter of Spanish Communist politician Dolores Ibárruri. 

He is buried at Kuntsevo Cemetery in Moscow.

References

1921 births
2008 deaths
Soviet prisoners of war
Joseph Stalin
Burials at Kuntsevo Cemetery
Soviet major generals
Children of Joseph Stalin